The Badzhal Range (Badzhalskiy Khrebet) is a mountain range in Khabarovsk Krai, Russian Far East.

The mountains are mainly composed of volcanic rock, sandstone and shale, as well as chalk, and andesite-basalt, with granites, porphyry and gabbro-granodiorite intrusions.

Geography
In its flanks the range is bound by the Amur to the NW and its tributary Amgun river valleys to the SE. At its ends it is limited by the valleys of the Gorin, a left tributary of the Amur, and the Urmi, a right tributary of the Tunguska, also a left tributary of the Amur. To the southwest the Badzhal Range connects with the Bureya Range.

Hydrography
The sources of the Gorin River are located in the Dayana Ridge subrange. Other rivers originating in the Badzhal Range are the  Gerbi, Talidzhak and Badzhal. There are karst lakes in the range area.

Flora 
The slopes of the range are covered deciduous forests, followed by taiga with a predominance of fir and Siberian spruce at higher elevations. Mountain tundra of shrubs and lichens grows in the highest summits.

See also
List of mountains and hills of Russia

References

External links

Mountain ranges of Khabarovsk Krai
ceb:Badzhal'skiy Khrebet
ru:Баджальский хребет